Arthur Hodges (c. 1893 – December 18, 1914) was a white man who became the first person in Clark County, Arkansas to be executed by means of the electric chair. Prior to that all executions were carried out by way of hanging or firing squad. He was the fourth person so executed in Arkansas and one of eight men executed by the state in a 16-day period. The eight executions in a 16-day period were the subject of an article, "Eight to Die in Arkansas", published in The Kansas City Star.

Case facts

The 21-year-old Hodges was convicted of killing a Clark County constable while resisting arrest. As described in court documents, Clark County Constable Morgan Garner, assisted by citizen J.E. Chancellor, arrested Hodges for the theft of a pistol and some small items of value. Hodges inquired as to whether Garner had a warrant for his arrest, to which Garner replied he did not. Hodges then refused to be arrested, at which point Garner produced his service pistol, ordering Hodges to put his hands up and submit to a search. Hodges did have a pistol on his person, but Garner, by Hodges' own admission, failed to find the weapon during a search of him. Hodges claimed that he was abused physically by Garner, and that while en route to the jail Garner threatened to shoot him. Hodges then claimed that he produced his own pistol, which Garner had not located, and fired in an effort to frighten Garner. Instead, Garner was shot twice, killing him. Hodges appealed his Clark County conviction and sentence of execution, but the Clark County decision was upheld. He was executed on December 18, 1914.

See also
 Capital punishment in Arkansas
 Capital punishment in the United States

General references
 "Eight to Die in Arkansas," The Kansas City Star, November 18, 1914, p. 3

External links 
 List of Arkansas executions

1914 in the United States
1914 deaths
American people convicted of murder
People executed for murder
20th-century executions by Arkansas
People executed by Arkansas by electric chair
People convicted of murder by Arkansas
Year of birth uncertain
20th-century executions of American people